The Important Witness is an American 1933 pre-Code crime drama directed by Sam Newfield which stars Noel Francis, Dorothy Burgess, and Donald Dillaway.

Cast list
 Noel Francis as Ellen Kelly
 Dorothy Burgess as Ruth Dana
 Donald Dillaway as Steve Connors
 Noel Madison as Gus Miranda
 Robert Ellis as Jack (Duke Farnham)
 Charles Delaney as Joe Murphy
 Paul Fix as Tony
 Ben Hendricks Jr. as Red Getchel
 Ethel Wales as Bride
 Gladys Blake
 Mary Dunn
 John Deering

References

External links

1933 films
American crime drama films
Films directed by Sam Newfield
American black-and-white films
1933 crime drama films
1930s American films